Changla is a mountain in the Himalayas of Asia.

See also
 List of mountains in China
 List of mountains in Nepal
 List of Ultras of the Himalayas

References

Mountains of Tibet
China–Nepal border
International mountains of Asia
Six-thousanders of the Himalayas
Mountains of the Karnali Province